The Spangler Hills are a low mountain range in the Mojave Desert, in northwestern San Bernardino County, California.

They are east of Ridgecrest and west of the Panamint Range, in an area managed by the Bureau of Land Management.

References 

Mountain ranges of the Mojave Desert
Mountain ranges of Southern California
Mountain ranges of San Bernardino County, California
Bureau of Land Management areas in California